Loloma Irene Livingston (1920 – 23 July 2010) was a Fijian artist and politician. Alongside Irene Jai Narayan and Losalini Raravuya Dovi, she was one of the first female members of the Legislative Council.

Political career
A fourth-generation European Fijian, Livingston trained as a nurse. She contested the Western General seat in the 1966 elections as the Alliance Party candidate, and was elected with a majority of over 1,000.

Livingston was a motoring enthusiast and was a member of the North West Car Club. She was also an advocate of adult education, and taught a series of English classes.

She died in Queensland, Australia in July 2010.

References

1920 births
20th-century Fijian women politicians
20th-century Fijian politicians
Members of the Legislative Council of Fiji
2010 deaths
Fijian emigrants to Australia